Flintridge Preparatory School, familiarly known as Flintridge Prep or simply Prep, is a coeducational day school for grades 7-12. Founded in 1933, it is located in La Cañada Flintridge, California, United States.

Facilities
School facilities include a science/cultural center, multiple classroom buildings with labs (renovated in 2014–2015, two computer laboratories, a state-of-the-art two-story library, a performing arts center, a 400-seat auditorium (renovated in 2015), an administration building with faculty offices, and an alumni and development office building.

The Chandramohan Library is a two-story library and learning center that includes a computer lab, a classroom for seminars, meeting rooms, space for individual and group study, and a laptop room.

The Randall Performing Arts Center includes practice rooms for individuals and groups of musicians, as well as dance rehearsal space. Miller Theater is a black-box theater that is used for many of the school's drama performances.

Athletics facilities include a full-size gymnasium, a six-lane swimming pool, a multi-sport playing field with a softball diamond, and a soccer field. Athletics facilities also include a fully equipped weight-training room and a professional training room for injury prevention and rehabilitation.

Student experience 
Flintridge Prep emphasizes academic engagement, strong relationships between faculty and students, and a variety of student leadership opportunities, including 50+ clubs, a peer counseling program, an outdoor education program, and a student-run government called Student Senate.

Seniors participate in a series of culminating projects, including independent study projects, in which they study with a faculty or community member of their choice in their final semester of school. Roughly a third of students participate in Independent Studies. Altogether more than 80% of seniors participate in an end-of-year presentation of their research.

Beginning in 8th grade, students begin an integrated leadership program, which culminates in 95% of students taking leadership roles in their final year of high school. The school also has STEAM and robotics programs, as well as a Student Community Impact Council, which fosters meaningful service impact in the local, regional and international community.

More than 50% of students participate in performing arts, and two-thirds of high school students participate in one of the school's 13 varsity sports.

History, traditions and values 
Founded as an all-boys school, the school became coed in the academic year 1979–80.

Each fall, all members of the community (including faculty and staff) sign the honor code, the universal code of ethics across campus. The Family BBQ, STEAM & Service Fair and Junior Parent Dinner are other annual traditions. Homecoming, Alumni Sports Day and reunions are a few of the annual traditions that bring the community together.

Students go through several rites of passage, including retreats and class trips. The culmination of life at Prep is the Pine Cone Ceremony, which occurs on the last night of the Senior Trip, just before Commencement.

The Senior Patio and Lawn are closely “guarded“ by seniors throughout the academic year. Each May, the rising junior class receives its senior privileges and takes over the Senior Patio.

Accreditation
Flintridge Prep is accredited by the California Association of Independent Schools and is a charter member of the Western Association of Schools and Colleges. It holds memberships in the California Association of Independent Schools, the National Association of Independent Schools, the Western Association of College Counselors, the Cum Laude Society, and the Educational Records Bureau. Flintridge complies with the National Association for College Admission Counseling's Statement of Principles of Good Practice. It also participates in the American Field Service and the Independent School Alliance for Minority Affairs.

Admissions, enrollment and financial aid
The student body includes approximately 500 students in grades 7 through 12, about 100 of whom are seniors.

There are two main entry points into Prep, in 7th grade and in 9th, although candidates are sometimes admitted at other grade levels. The admissions process begins in the fall preceding the school year for which applicants are interested in applying and consists of completing an application, submitting teacher recommendations and transcripts, taking the Independent School Entrance Exam (ISEE) and having an interview. Students attend the school Prep from 99 schools. Once admitted, students tend to stay. The school hosts an annual Open House for prospective families in December.

Financial aid is available, and in 2017, the school awarded $2,470,000 in aid to 25% of the student body for the 2017–2018 school year. The average amount of aid is 56% of tuition.

Grades and rank
The school runs on a semester system, with four grading periods per year. Grades re-recorded at the end of each course. A year course yields one credit in that subject. Students normally take 5-8 credits each year. Class periods are 1 hour long on normal days and 75 minutes long on block days. Classes meet 3 times per week. Students are not ranked. GPA is based on all coursework except PE.

The school does not award Valedictorian and Salutatorian honors. The highest academic awards are the Founder's Trophy, which recognizes a graduate who, in the opinion of the faculty, best represents the following school ideals: academic skills and dedication, the ability to be a team member as well as a leader, and the willingness to contribute to the well-being of one's fellow students and to the community. The school also awards the Benton Memorial Award to a graduate who represents, in the opinion of the faculty, outstanding sensitivity and creativity in intellectual pursuits.

Graduation requirements
4 years of English, 3 of math, 3 of world languages, 3 of history; 2 of laboratory science, and 2 of fine arts are required. Community service hours are not counted as a graduation requirement, but a commitment to service through the school's Student Community Action Council and other leadership programs is encouraged. Physical education is required through sophomore year.

Notable alumni

Ramses Barden, wide receiver for the Cal Poly Mustangs, New York Giants
Stephen J. Cannell, television producer, writer, novelist
Mark Geragos, attorney
Sarah Gilman, actor
Harry Hamlin, actor
Jeff Krosnoff (deceased), IndyCar driver
Bill Monning, California State Senator
Dennis Muren, Academy Award winner, filmmaker, special effects honoree
Emily Osment, actor
Haley Joel Osment, Academy Award-nominated actor
Cristina Perez, attorney, television personality, and writer
JP Blecksmith, American military officer who was the first officer killed in Operation Phantom Fury during Operation Iraqi Freedom II

References

External links

High schools in Los Angeles County, California
La Cañada Flintridge, California
Private middle schools in California
Private high schools in California
1933 establishments in California
Educational institutions established in 1933